Ghofrane Mohammad (born 6 June 1989) is a Syrian hurdler from Aleppo. At the 2012 Summer Olympics, she competed in the Women's 400 metres hurdles. She did not advance from round 1 and was later disqualified for testing positive for methylhexaneamine.

She competed for Syria also at the 2016 Summer Olympics in the women's 400 metres hurdles. She finished 8th in her heat and did not qualify for the semifinals. She was the flag bearer for Syria during the closing ceremony.

Personal bests
Outdoor
100 m – 12.12 (Taipa 2006)
200 m – 24.45 (Taipa 2006)
400 m – 55.26 (Amman 2007)
100 m H – 14.03 (El Maadi 2022)
400 m H – 56.89 NR (Almaty 2016)
Indoor
400 m – 55.45 (Doha 2016)
60 m H – 9.15 (Istanbul 2012)

Competition record

References

1989 births
Living people
Syrian female hurdlers
Sportspeople from Aleppo
Doping cases in athletics
Olympic athletes of Syria
Athletes (track and field) at the 2012 Summer Olympics
Athletes (track and field) at the 2016 Summer Olympics
World Athletics Championships athletes for Syria
21st-century Syrian women